Mathews Corners is an unincorporated community in New Castle County, Delaware, United States. Mathews Corners is located on Delaware Route 299, just west of Delaware Route 9, to the southeast of Odessa.

References

Unincorporated communities in New Castle County, Delaware
Unincorporated communities in Delaware